Kantaphod is a small village and a nagar panchayat in Dewas district in the Indian state of Madhya Pradesh. It is located on the foot of Malwa plateau on the bank of Chandrakeshar river.

Demographics
 India census, Kantaphod had a population of 9,240. Males constitute 52% of the population and females 48%. Kantaphod has an average literacy rate of 52%, lower than the national average of 59.5%: male literacy is 63%, and female literacy is 41%. In Kantaphod, 18% of the population is under 6 years of age.

The main occupation of the people being agriculture, cotton, and soybean. These are the major kharif crops. Only .2 km from the village there is a dam on Chandrakeshar river. This is the major source of irrigation in the rabi season. A few number of ginning factories are situated in the region.

Connectivity

Rail
Kanntaphod has no rail connectivity. The nearest important railway station is Indore Junction railway station and Harda railway station.

Air
The nearest airport is Devi Ahilyabai Holkar Airport, Indore.

References

Cities and towns in Dewas district